The 2015 PSL season is the third season of the Philippine Super Liga (PSL). There were two indoor conferences for the season – the All-Filipino, and the Grand Prix. It staged its first beach volleyball tournament, the Challenge Cup, for the women's and men's divisions.

Developments
 The PSL is now sanctioned under the Larong Volleyball sa Pilipinas, Inc. (LVPI), the newest governing body for volleyball in the Philippines under the leadership of POC 1st Vice President Joey Romasanta, aside for being recognized by the AVC and the FIVB. The PSL was first sanctioned by the Philippine Volleyball Federation (PVF) until the federation was stripped of its recognition by the local (POC) and foreign (FIVB, AVC) sport governing bodies. The LVPI also supported the stints of Cignal and Petron who participated in the Asian Club Championships, and helped on the processing of the imports transfer clearances for the 12 imports that played in the Grand Prix.
 The PSL introduced the use of "skorts", a combination of tennis-like skirts and shorts, as part of the women's uniforms during the All Filipino Conference, but it was discontinued during the PSL Grand Prix.
 Continuous coaching and players, television crew, officiating (referees), volleyball information system, press corps and medical seminars.
 After the introduction of the Men's Division in the PSL in 2013, the PSL launched the Beach Volleyball division thru the Challenge Cup and Open Series.
 The PSL's official newspaper, PSL Trending, managed by the PSL Press Corps under its president, Marc Anthony Reyes of the Philippine Daily Inquirer. PSL Trending is given to the fans for free at the venues during gamedays.
 The PSL has partnered with the TV5 Network (TV5, AksyonTV and Sports5.ph) for three years starting 2015, for broadcast and online coverage.
 The PSL became the third Southeast Asian-based volleyball club league (next to Thailand and Vietnam) to utilize the video challenge system to decide crucial calls of the games for a fair and balanced officiating, as part of the full compliance to the FIVB rules. The video challenge equipment arrived on October 26, 2015 and was used during the second round of the 2015 Grand Prix conference.

2015 draft (Women's Division)

The draft was held on March 12, 2015 at SM Aura Premier, Taguig.

First round

Second round

Indoor Volleyball

All-Filipino Conference

The Petron Blaze Spikers became the first team to sweep a PSL tournament with a 13–0 record and claim the All-Filipino championship, its second consecutive PSL title. There was no men's tournament for this conference.

Classification round (March 21 to April 23, 2015):

|}

Playoffs (April 25 to May 16, 2015):

Final standing:

Awards:

Grand Prix Conference

The Grand Prix Conference started on October 10, 2015 at the Alonte Sports Arena in Binan, Laguna. There was no men's tournament for this conference.

Classification round (October 10 to November 16, 2015):

|}

Playoffs (November 19 to December 5, 2015):

Final standings:

Beach Volleyball

Women's Division

Final standing:

Men's Division

Final standing:

International competitions

AVC Asian Women's Championship

An all-PSL selection represented the Philippines in the 2015 Asian Women's Volleyball Championship. The team placed 12th out of 14 competitors.

Coaching staff
 Head coach:Sinfronio "Sammy" Acaylar (CIG)
 Assistant coach(es):Francis Vicente (PHG)Rosemarie Prochina (MNT)Benson Bocboc (SHP)

Team staff
 Team manager:
 Team Utility: 

Medical staff
 Team physician:
 Physical therapist:Marie Ong

AVC Club Championships
The champions of the 2014 Grand Prix - the Petron Blaze Spikers (women's) and the Cignal HD Spikers (men's) - represented the Philippines in the 2015 AVC Club Volleyball Championships.

 The Petron Blaze Spikers placed 8th out of 9 competitors in the women's tournament held in Vietnam on September 12 to 20, 2015.
 The Cignal HD Spikers placed 12th out of 16 competitors in the men's tournament held in Taipei on August 13 to 21, 2015.

Spike For Peace International Beach Volleyball

The women's division champions of the 2015 Beach Challenge Cup, Danika Gendrauli and Norie Jane Diaz, were the PSL representatives in the 2015 Spike For Peace International Beach Volleyball Tournament held in Manila from November 29 to December 3, 2015.

Gendrauli and Diaz played as Philippines (Team B). Charo Soriano and Alexa Micek represented the Shakey's V-League and played as Philippines (Team A).

Team A finished 12th and Team B finished 13th (last).

Venues

All-Filipino Conference:
Cuneta Astrodome (main venue)
Mall of Asia Arena (March 21 - opening day)
Filoil Flying V Arena (March 29 and March 30)
Alonte Sports Arena ("Spike on Tour" / March 26, April 9 and April 18)
Quezon Convention Center ("Spike on Tour" / April 25)
Imus City Sports Center ("Spike on Tour" / May 11 / Finals Game 1)

Beach Volleyball:
Sands - SM By The Bay (SM Mall of Asia)

Grand Prix:
Cuneta Astrodome (main venue)
Filoil Flying V Arena (secondary venue)
Alonte Sports Arena (October 10 - opening day)
Malolos Sports and Convention Center ("Spike on Tour" / November 7)
De La Salle Lipa ("Spike on Tour" / November 14)
Imus City Sports Center ("Spike on Tour" / November 21)

Brand ambassador
 Charleen Abigail Cruz

Broadcast partners
 TV5, AksyonTV, Sports5.ph
 Solar Sports

Controversies
On October, PVF President Edgardo "Boy" Cantada, condemned the act of the LVPI and Score (headed by Ramon Suzara, the president of PSL, and one of the masterminds in the withdrawal of recognition of PVF in the POC, AVC, and FIVB) over the incident involving 12 imports of the Philippine Super Liga Grand Prix who have gone through the immigration process and play in the league without any necessary working permits and other documents of foreigners who will work in the country. He also criticized LVPI and Suzara for blatant disregard and abuse of the Philippine immigration and labor laws over the incident.

References

Philippine Super Liga
PSL
PSL